is a Japanese actor, voice actor and narrator from Aomori Prefecture. Previously affiliated with Tokyo Actor's Consumer's Cooperative Society and Sigma Seven, he is attached to Aoni Production. With his distinctive grim voice, he is best known as the Japanese voice of Doctor Drakken in Kim Possible and Kibito in Dragon Ball Z.

Filmography

Television drama
Shishino Jidai (1980 Taiga Drama), Shinzō Hashikawa, Shidō Hōgen
Dokuganryū Masamune (1987 Taiga Drama), Furukawa Danjo

Tokusatsu
Android Kikaider (1972-1973), Red Inimicus (ep. 27 & 28)
Kikaider 01 (1973-1974), Mini Gorilla (ep. 36)
Inazuman (1973-1974), Stone Banbara (ep. 24)
Inazuman Flash (1974), Jet Desper (ep. 8)
Himitsu Sentai Goranger (1975-1977), Gunman Masked (ep. 51), Windmill Masked (ep. 66), Glasses Masked (ep. 74)
Kaiketsu Zubat (1977), Narrator
J.A.K.Q. Dengekitai (1977), Devil Sphinx (ep. 12), Tentacle Lay Priest (ep. 28)
Spider-Man (1978-1979), Cockroach Kombinat (ep. 24), Crab Demon (ep. 25)
Battle Fever J (1979-1980), Cobra Monster (ep. 11), Jagged Tooth Monster (ep. 20), Curse Monster (ep. 46)
Space Sheriff Gavan (1982-1983), Gamara Monster, Grudge Roadshow Narrator
Chikyu Sentai Fiveman (1990-1991), Galaxy Demon God Barrugin (ep. 20)
Kamen Rider Revice (2021-2022), Giff

Television animation
Time Bokan (1975), Okānegi
Muteking, The Dashing Warrior (1980), Takosaku
Dr. Slump (1981), Gang leader, Killer Sniper
Blue Comet SPT Layzner (1985), Zūru
Dragon Ball (1986), Sergeant Metallic
City Hunter (1987), Master
Idol Densetsu Eriko (1989), Saijō
Dragon Quest: The Adventure of Dai (1991), Matoriv
YuYu Hakusho (1992), Kuromomo Tarō
Nekketsu Saikyō Go-Saurer (1993), Gigu, Robot God
Dragonball Z (1994), Kibito
Mobile Fighter G Gundam (1994), Commissioner Karato
After War Gundam X (1996), Fixx Bloodman
Detective Conan (1996), Masayuki Ogawa
Dragonball GT (1996), Qi Xing Lóng
Hell Teacher Nūbē (1996), Hatamonba
Steam Detectives (1998), Jimoshii
Yu-Gi-Oh! (1998), Kanakura
Da Capo of Love: Fujiko's Unlucky Days (1999), Antique arts dealer
Boogiepop Phantom (2000), Tōka Miyashita's father
Detective Conan (2000), Taiji Komiyama
Detective Conan (2001), Futoshi Takarada
Detective Conan (2002), Eizō Kurata
Fullmetal Alchemist (2003), Basque Grand
Detective Conan (2004), Officer Ogura
Samurai Champloo (2004), Kogorō
Genesis of Aquarion (2005), Johannes
Nodame Cantabile (2007), Seiichirō Miyoshi
Dragon Ball Kai (2014), Kibito
One Piece (2014), Don Chinjao
Rowdy Sumo Wrestler Matsutaro!! (2014), Raijin-oyakata

Original video animation (OVA)
Mobile Suit Gundam 0083: Stardust Memory (1991), Yuri Hasler
Sohryuden: Legend of the Dragon Kings (1991), Seiichirō Toba
Genesis of Aquarion (2007), Johannes

Theatrical animation
Dragon Quest: Dai no Daiboken (1992), Matolif
Dragon Ball Z: Wrath of the Dragon (1995), Hildegarn
Crayon Shin-chan: Pursuit of the Balls of Darkness (1997), The Evil

Video games
Dragon Ball series, Kibito, Hildegarn
Klonoa 2: Lunatea's Veil (2001), Momett

Dubbing

Live-action
Kevin McNally
Pirates of the Caribbean: The Curse of the Black Pearl, Joshamee Gibbs
Pirates of the Caribbean: Dead Man's Chest, Joshamee Gibbs
Pirates of the Caribbean: At World's End, Joshamee Gibbs
Pirates of the Caribbean: On Stranger Tides, Joshamee Gibbs
Pirates of the Caribbean: Dead Men Tell No Tales, Joshamee Gibbs
Ally McBeal, Robert Perry (Michael Kagan)
Brothers & Sisters, William Walker (Tom Skerritt)
Cliffhanger (1995 Fuji TV edition), Treasury Agent (Bruce McGill)
Cliffhanger (1997 NTV edition), Walter Wright (Paul Winfield)
Death Becomes Her, E.R. Doctor (Sydney Pollack)
Dr. Dolittle, Grandpa Archer Dolittle (Ossie Davis)
ER, Dexter Jenkins (Lou Beatty Jr.), Edgar Dixon (David Jean Thomas)
Free Willy (1997 TV Asahi edition), Wade (Richard Riehle)
GoldenEye, Jack Wade (Joe Don Baker)
The Haunting, Doctor David Marrow (Liam Neeson)
Mary Reilly, Mr. Reilly (Michael Gambon)
Planet of the Apes, Colonel Attar (Michael Clarke Duncan)
Star Wars: The Rise of Skywalker, Palpatine / Darth Sidious (Ian McDiarmid)
Tenet, Sir Michael Crosby (Michael Caine)
Titanic, Spicer Lovejoy (David Warner)
Vampires, Cardinal Alba (Maximilian Schell)

Animation
Aaahh!!! Real Monsters, The Gromble
The Adventures of Tintin, Roberto Rastapopoulos
Babar, Lord Rataxes
Batman: the Animated Series, Joey "the Snail" Martin
Chicken Run, Nick
Kim Possible, Doctor Drakken
The Many Adventures of Winnie the Pooh, Narrator
The Simpsons, Principal Skinner
The Tigger Movie, Narrator

References

External links
 Official agency profile 
 
 

1941 births
Living people
Male voice actors from Aomori Prefecture
Japanese male video game actors
Japanese male voice actors
20th-century Japanese male actors
21st-century Japanese male actors
Aoni Production voice actors
Sigma Seven voice actors
Tokyo Actor's Consumer's Cooperative Society voice actors